The IAU European 24 Hour Championships is a biennial long-distance running competition in the 24-hour run for athletes from Europe. Organised by the International Association of Ultrarunners, it was first held in 1992 as an annual competition known as the IAU European 24 Hours Challenge. The establishment of the IAU 24 Hour World Championship in 2003 saw the European event staged within the global race until the competitions were each recast as separate, biennial championships, with the world event in odd years and the European one in even years. The competition is typically a road running one, though the championships was contested on the track in 1999.

Editions

Medallists

Men's individual

Men's team

Women's individual

Women's team

References

Results
Michiels, Paul & Milroy, Andy (2016-02-06). European 24 Hour Championships. Association of Road Racing Statisticians. Retrieved 2019-08-07.

24 Hour
Ultramarathons
Recurring sporting events established in 1992
Road running competitions